The following outline is provided as an overview of and topical guide to science fiction:

Science fiction – a genre of fiction dealing with the impact of imagined innovations in science or technology, often in a futuristic setting. Exploring the consequences of such innovations is the traditional purpose of science fiction, making it a "literature of ideas".

What is science fiction?

 Definitions of science fiction: Science fiction includes such a wide range of themes and subgenres that it is notoriously difficult to define. Accordingly, there have been many definitions offered. Another challenge is that there is disagreement over where to draw the boundaries between science fiction and related genres.

Science fiction is a type of:

 Fiction – form of narrative which deals, in part or in whole, with events that are not factual, but rather, imaginary and invented by its author(s). Although fiction often describes a major branch of literary work, it is also applied to theatrical, cinematic, and musical work.
 Genre fiction – fictional works (novels, short stories) written with the intent of fitting into a specific literary genre in order to appeal to readers and fans already familiar with that genre. Also known as popular fiction.
 Speculative fiction
 Genre – science fiction is a genre of fiction.

Genres 

Science fiction genre – while science fiction is a genre of fiction, a science fiction genre is a subgenre within science fiction. Science fiction may be divided along any number of overlapping axes. Gary K. Wolfe's Critical Terms for Science Fiction and Fantasy identifies over 30 subdivisions of science fiction, not including science fantasy (which is a mixed genre).

Science 
Genres concerning the emphasis, accuracy, and type of science described include:
Hard science fiction—a particular emphasis on scientific detail and/or accuracy.
 Mundane science fiction—a subgenre of hard sci-fi which sets stories on Earth or the Solar System using current or plausible technology.
Soft science fiction—focus on human characters and their relations and feelings, often exploring psychology, sociology, anthropology, and political science, while de-emphasizing the details of technological hardware and physical laws. In some cases, science and technology are depicted without much concern for accuracy.

Characteristics 

Themes related to science, technology, space and the future, as well as characteristic plots or settings include:

 Apocalyptic and post-apocalyptic science fiction
 Biopunk — centered around  biotechnology and genetic engineering in general, biopunk uses some both (post)cyberpunk elements and post-modernist prose to describe a typically dystopian world of biohackers, man-made viruses, mutations, designer babies, artificial life forms, bio-genetic engineered human-animal hybrids and bio-genetically manipulated humans.
 Cyberpunk — uses elements from the hard-boiled detective novel, film noir, Japanese anime, and post-modernist prose to describe the nihilistic, underground side of a cybernetic society
 Climate fiction — emphasizes effects of anthropogenic climate change and global warming at the end of the Holocene era
 Dying Earth science fiction
 Military science fiction
 Steampunk — denotes works set in (or strongly inspired by) an era when steam power was still widely used — usually the 19th century, and often set in Victorian England — though with otherwise high technology or other science fiction elements
 Time travel
 Space colonization
 Space opera — emphasizes romantic adventure, exotic settings, and larger-than-life characters
 Social science fiction — concerned less with technology and more with sociological speculation about human society
 Mundane science fiction

Movements 
Genres concerning politics, philosophy, and identity movements include:
 Christian science fiction
 Feminist science fiction
 LGBT themes in speculative fiction
 Libertarian science fiction

Eras 
Genres concerning the historical era of creation and publication include:

 Scientific romance — an archaic name for what is now known as the science fiction genre, mostly associated with the early science fiction of the United Kingdom.
 Pulp science fiction
 Golden Age of Science Fiction — a period of the 1940s during which the science fiction genre gained wide public attention and many classic science fiction stories were published.
 New Wave science fiction — characterised by a high degree of experimentation, both in form and in content.
 Cyberpunk — noted for its focus on "high tech, low life" and taking its name from the combination of cybernetics and punk.

Combinations 

Genres that combine two different fiction genres or use a different fiction genre's mood or style include: 
 Alternate history science fiction—fiction set in a world in which history has diverged from history as it is generally known
 Comic science fiction
 Science fiction erotica
 Adventure science fiction—science fiction adventure is similar to many genres 
 Gothic science fiction—a subgenre of science fiction that involves gothic conventions
 New Wave science fiction—characterized by a high degree of experimentation, both in form and in content
 Science fantasy—a mixed genre of story which contains some science fiction and some fantasy elements
 Science fiction opera—a mixture of opera and science fiction involving empathic themes
 Science fiction romance—fiction which has elements of both the science fiction and romance genres
 Science fiction mystery—fiction which has elements of both the science fiction and mystery genres, encompassing Occult detective fiction and science fiction detectives
 Science fiction Western—fiction which has elements of both the science fiction and Western genres
 Space Western—a subgenre of science fiction that transposes themes of American Western books and film to a backdrop of futuristic space frontiers.
 Spy-fi a subgenre of spy fiction that includes some science fiction.

Related genres 
 Fantasy
 Science fantasy
 Mystery fiction
 Horror fiction
 Slipstream fiction
 Utopian and dystopian fiction
 Superhero fiction

By country

 Australian science fiction
 Bengali science fiction
 Canadian science fiction
 Chilean science fiction
 Chinese science fiction
 Croatian science fiction
 Czech science fiction
 Estonian science fiction
 French science fiction
 Japanese science fiction
 Norwegian science fiction
 Polish science fiction
 Romanian science fiction
 Russian science fiction
 Serbian science fiction
 Spanish science fiction

History 

 History of science fiction films

Elements and themes

Character elements 
 List of stock characters in science fiction
 Extraterrestrials in fiction

Plot elements

Plot devices 
 Hyperspace

Setting elements 
The setting is the environment in which the story takes place. Alien settings require authors to do worldbuilding to create a fictional planet and geography. Elements of setting may include culture (and its technologies), period (including the future), place (geography/astronomy), nature (physical laws, etc.), and hour.  Setting elements characteristic of science fiction include:

Place 
 Parallel universes
 Planets in science fiction
 Hyperspace
 Slipstream
 Earth in science fiction

Cultural setting elements 
 Political ideas in science fiction
 Utopian and dystopian fiction
 World government in science fiction
 World government in fiction
 Religious ideas in science fiction
 List of religious ideas in science fiction
 Religion in speculative fiction
 Xenology

Sex and gender 

 Gender in science fiction
Sex in science fiction
Pregnancy in science fiction
 LGBT themes in speculative fiction

Technology 

 Computer technology
 Artificial intelligence in fiction
 List of fictional computers
 Mind uploading in fiction
 Transportation
 Flying car (aircraft)
 Space dock
Weapons in science fiction
 Resizing
 Simulated reality in fiction
 Space warfare in fiction
 Weapons in science fiction

Themes 

 First contact

Style elements

Works

Art 
List of science fiction and fantasy artists
 Science fiction comics

Games

Computer games

Role-playing games

Literature 
 Science fiction comics
 Speculative poetry

Novels 

 List of science fiction novels

Short stories 
 List of science fiction short stories

Short story venues 
 Science fiction magazine

 Science fiction fanzine

Video 
 Science fiction film
 Science fiction on television
List of science fiction television programs
 List of science fiction sitcoms
 U.S. television science fiction
 British television science fiction

Radio 
 Science fiction radio programs

Information sources
Baen Free Library
Internet Speculative Fiction DataBase
Science Fiction and Fantasy Writers of America
The Encyclopedia of Science Fiction

In academia 

 Science fiction studies
 New Wave science fiction
 Science in science fiction
 Materials science in science fiction
 Science fiction and fantasy journals
 Science fiction libraries and museums

Subculture 

Science fiction conventions
 List of science fiction conventions
 List of fan conventions by date of founding
Science fiction fandom
 Science fiction fanzine
 Science fiction organizations

Awards 

The science fiction genre has a number of recognition awards for authors, editors, and illustrators.  Awards are usually granted annually.

International awards
Major awards given in chronological order:

Nationality-specific awards
Australian
Aurealis Award—Australian
Chandler Award—for contributions to Australian Science fiction
Ditmar Award—for SF by Australians
British
Kitschies—for speculative fiction novels published in the UK
Canadian
Constellation Awards—for the best SF/fantasy film or television works released in Canada
Prix Aurora Awards—for Canadian science fiction
Sunburst Award— Juried award for Canadian science fiction
Chinese
The Galaxy Awards (银河奖)—given by magazine Science Fiction World for Chinese SF&F
Croatian
SFERA Award—given by SFera, a Croatian SF society
Dutch
Paul Harland Prize—for Dutch SF
Estonian
Stalker Award—for the best Estonian SF novel, given out on Estcon by Eesti Ulmeühing, the Estonian SF society.
Finnish
Tähtivaeltaja Award—for the best SF novel released in Finland
French
Grand Prix de l'Imaginaire—France since 1974
Prix Jules-Verne—France 1927–1933 and 1958–1963
Prix Tour-Apollo Award—France 1972-1990
German
Kurd-Laßwitz-Preis—German SF award
Israeli
Geffen Award (פרס גפן)—Israel since 1999
Italian
Premio Urania—for Italian SF
Japanese
Nihon SF Taisho Award (日本SF大賞)—Japan since 1980
New Zealander
Sir Julius Vogel Award—for SF by New Zealanders
Pacific Northwestern
Endeavour Award—for SF by Pacific Northwest author
Polish
Janusz A. Zajdel Award—award of Polish fandom
Nautilus Award—Polish award
Romanian
SRSFF Award—România
Russian
Big Roscon award for outstanding contribution to science fiction
Turkish
TBD Science Fiction Story Award—Turkey

Themed awards
(Chronological)
Prometheus Award—best libertarian SF—since 1979
Lambda Literary Award—since 1988
Tiptree Award—since 1991
Golden Duck Awards—best children's SF—1992-2017
Sidewise Award for Alternate History—since 1995
Gaylactic Spectrum Awards—since 1999
Emperor Norton Award—San Francisco—2003-2011
Science Fiction & Fantasy Translation Awards—2011-2014

New artists / first works awards
Compton Crook Award—for best first novel
Jack Gaughan Award—for best emerging artist
John W. Campbell Award—for best new writer
Writers of the Future—contest for new authors

Career awards
Damon Knight Memorial Grand Master Award—associated with the Nebula

Influential people

Creators

Artists 
List of science fiction and fantasy artists

Filmmakers

Authors and editors
 List of science fiction authors
 Women science fiction authors
 List of science fiction editors

Science fiction scholars 
 Brian Aldiss
 Isaac Asimov—Asimov on Science Fiction
 Brian Attebery
 Everett F. Bleiler
 John W. Campbell
 John Clute—co-editor of The Encyclopedia of Science Fiction (with Peter Nicholls)
 Samuel R. Delany
 Hugo Gernsback—founder of the pioneering science fiction magazine Amazing Stories, and the person who the Hugo Awards are named after.
 David Hartwell
 Larry McCaffery
 Judith Merril
 Sam Moskowitz
 Peter Nicholls—co-editor of The Encyclopedia of Science Fiction (with John Clute)
 Alexei Panshin
 David Pringle—editor of Foundation and Interzone; author of Science Fiction: The 100 Best Novels
 Andrew Sawyer
 Dorothy Scarborough
 Brian Stableford
 Darko Suvin
 Gary K. Wolfe

Franchises

There are a number of science fiction media franchises of this type, typically encompassing media such as cinema films, TV shows, toys, and even theme parks related to the content. The highest-grossing science fiction franchise is Star Wars.

Space science fiction franchises:
 Alien (6 films since 1979 and 2 Alien vs Predator films since 2004)
 Babylon 5 (2 television series, 7 TV movies since 1993)
 Battlestar Galactica (5 television series and two TV movies since 1979)
 Doctor Who (TV series since 1963, 2 Dr. Who films since 1965, and 1 1996 television film, five spinoff TV shows (K-9 and Company, The Sarah Jane Adventures, Torchwood, K-9 and Class), video games and hundreds of books)
 Dune (23 novels since 1965, 1 film in 1984, 3 comics since 1984, 2 TV series since 2000, 1 film in 2021)
 Godzilla (36 films since 1954 and 3 TV series since 1978)
 Halo (since 2001, started from video game)
 The Hitchhikers Guide to the Galaxy (1 film, 1 tv series, 1 game, 4 stage shows, 3 radio programs since 1978, 6 novels)
 Independence Day (2 films since 1996)
 Legend of the Galactic Heroes (2 novel series since 1983 and 3 anime OVA series since 1988)
 Macross (4 anime TV series since 1982, 6 anime films since 1984, 3 manga series since 1994)
 Mass Effect (since 2007, started from video game)
 Men in Black (4 films since 1997 and animated TV series)
 Mobile Suit Gundam (21 anime TV series since 1979, 7 anime films since 1988, successful model kits since 1980)
 Neon Genesis Evangelion (1 anime TV series since 1995 and 5 anime films since 1997)
 Planet of the Apes (9 films and 1 TV series since 1968)
 Predator (5 films since 1987 and 2 Alien vs Predator films since 2004)
 Robotech (1 anime TV series and 5 anime films since 1985)
 Space Battleship Yamato (5 anime TV series since 1974 and 7 anime films since 1977)
 Starcraft (since 1998, started from video game)
 Space Odyssey (2 short stories since 1954, 2 films since 1968, 4 novels since 1968, 1 1972 book)
 Star Trek (7 live-action TV series since 1966, 3 animated TV series, 13 Theatrical films: 6 Original Series films since 1979, 4 Next Generation films since 1994 and 3 reboot films since 2009)
 Star Wars (9 episodic "Saga" films since 1977, 1 1978 TV film, 2 Ewok films since 1985, 1 2008 The Clone Wars film, 2 "Anthology" films since 2016, 3 canon animated TV series since 2008, 1 canon live-action TV series since 2019, 3 Legends TV series since 1985)
 Stargate (4 TV series and three theater film since 1994)
The Expanse (8 novels and 1 television series since 2011)
 Transformers (28 TV series since 1984, 4 animated films since 1986, 5 live action films since 2007, started from toy line)
 Ultra Series (34 TV series since 1966 and 29 films since 1967)
 The War of the Worlds (half a dozen feature films, radio dramas, a record album, various comic book adaptations, a number of television series, and sequels or parallel stories by other authors since 1897)

See also

List of science fiction themes
 Outline of fiction
 Outline of fantasy
Timeline of science fiction

References

External links 

 Science Fiction (Bookshelf) at Project Gutenberg
 SF Hub—resources for science-fiction research, created by the University of Liverpool Library
 Science fiction fanzines (current and historical) online
 Science Fiction and Fantasy Writers of America—their "Suggested Reading" page
 Science Fiction Museum & Hall of Fame
 Science Fiction Research Association
 Science Fiction at the Internet Archive
  Ковтун Е. Н. Художественный вымысел в литературе 20 века. — Высшая школа, 2008. — 1500 экз. — .
  Жанры — рубрика журнала «Мир фантастики»
  Вячеслав Бабышев Внешние и внутренние жанры фантастики // Уральский следопыт. — 2014. — № 11 (689). — С. 81-84.
  Жанры фантастики на Фантлабе.
  Классификация фантастики на сайте «Фэнта Зиландия».

Science fiction
Science fiction
 1
 
Science fiction outline
Science fiction themes
Science fiction genres